Leopoldo Enrique García-Alas y Ureña (25 April 1852 – 13 June 1901), also known as Clarín, was a Spanish realist novelist born in Zamora. His inflammatory articles, known as paliques (“chitchat”), as well as his advocacy of liberalism and anti-clericalism, made him a formidable and controversial critical voice. He died in Oviedo.

Biography

Alas was born in Zamora, from Asturian parents who moved to that city. He spent his childhood living in León and Guadalajara, until he moved to Oviedo (Asturias) in 1863. There he studied for the  Bachillerato (Secondary Education) and began his law studies. He lived in Madrid from 1871 to 1878, where he began his career as a journalist (adopting the pen-name "Clarín" in 1875) and he graduated with the thesis El Derecho y la Moralidad (Law and Morality) in 1878. He taught in Zaragoza from 1882 to 1883. In 1883 he returned to Oviedo to take up a position as professor of Roman law.

Above all, Clarín is the author of La Regenta, his masterpiece and one of the best novels of the 19th century. It is a long work, similar to Flaubert's Madame Bovary, one of its influences. Other influences included Naturalism and Krausism, a philosophical current which promoted the cultural and ethical regeneration of Spain.

La Regenta is special for its great wealth of characters and secondary stories, while the main character's description is left slightly unfocused and vague. On the other hand, the downfall of the provincial lady has a place amidst two very diverse suitors: the most handsome man in the city and the cathedral's priest. The depiction of this priest is a key part of the book.

For the description of the provincial atmosphere and the city's collective life, Clarín used techniques such as the internal monologue or the free indirect style, which makes the story be narrated by the characters themselves and allows the reader to witness and experience their intimacy.

In 1890, he published a new novel, Su único hijo. Even though most critics consider it as a lesser novel in comparison with La Regenta, it is equal to the former in the skill with which the technical resources are used.  Su único hijo was originally meant to be the introduction to a trilogy, but aside from an outline and a few fragments of the two sequels, Su único hijo was Clarín's last full-length novel.

Apart from these works, Clarín is also the author of magnificent stories and of a large number of journalistic articles.  He also wrote an essay, "La Literatura en 1881" (1882), in collaboration with Armando Palacio Valdés.

Leopoldo Alas remains a rather enigmatic figure in the Spanish literary world, leaving a legacy that encouraged the search for God and humanism simultaneously. This aberrant confluence has facilitated the presence of various interpretations regarding the author's writings, most noticeably of his masterpiece, La Regenta.

Works

Fiction
La Regenta (The Regent's Wife) (1884–85) [Novel]
Su único hijo (His Only Son) (1890) [Novel]
Doña Berta (1892)
¡Adiós, Cordera! (1892)
Cuentos morales (Moral Stories) (1896)
El gallo de Sócrates (Socrates' Rooster) (1900)

Essays
 "Solos de saxofon alto 1er" (1881)
 "La literatura en 1881" (1882)
 "Sermón perdido" (1885)
 "Nueva campaña" (1887)
 "Ensayos y revistas" (1892)
 "Palique" (1894)

References

External links

 
 
 
A good website on the author, containing his works in digital version (In Spanish)
Text of Doña Berta in original Spanish

1852 births
1901 deaths
People from Zamora, Spain
19th-century Spanish novelists
Spanish male novelists
People from Asturias
University of Oviedo alumni
19th-century male writers